Linda Louise Jezek (born March 10, 1960) is an American former competition swimmer, Olympic medalist, and former world record-holder.

Jezek was a member of the second-place U.S. team in the 4×100-meter medley relay at the 1976 Summer Olympics in Montreal, Quebec.  She set the 200-meter backstroke world record (long course) in 1978.  Jezek was inducted into the "George F. Haines International Swim Center Hall of Fame" in 2002.

See also
 List of Olympic medalists in swimming (women)
 List of Stanford University people
 List of World Aquatics Championships medalists in swimming (women)
 World record progression 200 metres backstroke

References

 

1960 births
Living people
American female backstroke swimmers
World record setters in swimming
Medalists at the 1976 Summer Olympics
Olympic silver medalists for the United States in swimming
Sportspeople from Palo Alto, California
Stanford Cardinal women's swimmers
Swimmers at the 1976 Summer Olympics
Swimmers at the 1979 Pan American Games
World Aquatics Championships medalists in swimming
Pan American Games gold medalists for the United States
Pan American Games medalists in swimming
Medalists at the 1979 Pan American Games